This list comprises all players who have been placed on a regular-season roster for Los Angeles Sol since the team's first Women's Professional Soccer season in 2009.  This list does not include pre-season training rosters, short term players, or discovery players who do not appear for the club.

All-time statistics

Regular season statistics

Playoff statistics

Key to positions

External links
 Los Angeles Sol 2009 regular season statistics
 Los Angeles Sol 2009 playoff statistics

Players
 
Los Angeles Sol players
Association football player non-biographical articles
Los Angeles Sol players